Noel Simpson (23 December 1922 – 21 November 1987) was an English professional footballer who played as a wing half.

Career
Born in Mansfield, Simpson played for Nottingham Forest, Coventry City and Exeter City.

References

1922 births
1987 deaths
English footballers
Nottingham Forest F.C. players
Coventry City F.C. players
Exeter City F.C. players
English Football League players
Association football wing halves